Guriyeh (also Romanized as Gūrīyeh and Gūreyeh) is a city in Shoaybiyeh-ye Gharbi Rural District, Shadravan District, Shushtar County, Khuzestan Province, Iran. At the 2006 census, its population was 2,366, in 471 families.

References 

Populated places in Shushtar County
Cities in Khuzestan Province